A State of Trance 2011 is the eighth compilation album in the A State of Trance compilation series mixed and compiled by Dutch DJ and record producer Armin van Buuren. It was released on 18 March 2011 by Armada Music and Avex Asia.

Track listing

Charts

References

Armin van Buuren compilation albums
Electronic compilation albums
2011 compilation albums